Bolz is a surname. Notable people with the surname include:

Darrell Bolz (born 1943), American politician
Eugen Bolz (1881–1945), German politician
Hanns Bolz (1885–1918), German painter
Kate Bolz (born 1979), American politician
Lothar Bolz (1903–1986), German politician
Nadia Bolz-Weber (born 1969), American theologian
Norbert Bolz (born 1953), German philosopher